David Saelens (born 2 July 1975 in Ypres, West Flanders) is a racing driver from Belgium. He drove in several racing classes such as Formula Three, International Formula 3000, American Le Mans Series, DTM and most recently the 2018 Porsche Supercup. In 1998 he won the Marlboro Masters of Formula 3 at Zandvoort. In 1998 he became the first non-French driver to win the French Formula Three Championship.

Racing record

Career summary

Complete International Formula 3000 results
(key) (Races in bold indicate pole position) (Races in italics indicate fastest lap)

Complete Deutsche Tourenwagen Masters results 
(key) (Races in bold indicate pole position) (Races in italics indicate fastest lap)

24 Hours of Le Mans results

Complete Porsche Supercup results
(key) (Races in bold indicate pole position) (Races in italics indicate fastest lap)

References

External links
Driver DB Profile

1975 births
Living people
Artists from Ypres
Belgian racing drivers
International Formula 3000 drivers
24 Hours of Le Mans drivers
Deutsche Tourenwagen Masters drivers
American Le Mans Series drivers
British Formula Three Championship drivers
French Formula Three Championship drivers
French Formula Renault 2.0 drivers
Formula Renault Eurocup drivers
Porsche Supercup drivers
24 Hours of Spa drivers
Mercedes-AMG Motorsport drivers
Team Rosberg drivers
Super Nova Racing drivers
ART Grand Prix drivers
Porsche Carrera Cup Germany drivers